These are the partial results of the athletics competition at the 1971 Mediterranean Games taking place between 12 and 17 October in Izmir, Turkey.

Men's results

100 meters
Heats – 12 OctoberWind:

Final – 13 OctoberWind: +0.1 m/s

200 meters
HeatsWind:

Final – 16 OctoberWind: +0.1 m/s

400 meters
Heats – 13 October

Final – 14 October

800 meters
Heats – 15 October

Final – 16 October

1500 meters
Heats – 12 October

Final – 13 October

5000 meters
Heats – 12 October

Final – 14 October

10,000 meters
16 October

Marathon
17 October

110 meters hurdles
Heats – 14 OctoberWind:

Final – 15 OctoberWind: +0.3 m/s

400 meters hurdles
Heats – 12 October

Final – 13 October

3000 meters steeplechase
16 October

4 × 100 meters relay
15 October

4 × 400 meters relay
16 October

20 kilometers walk
12 October

50 kilometers walk
14 October

High jump
16 October

Pole vault
15 October

Long jump
13 October

Triple jump
15 October

Shot put
12 October

Discus throw
14 October

Hammer throw
15 October

Javelin throw
16 October

Decathlon
13–14 October

Women's results

100 meters
Heats – 12 October

Final – 13 October

400 meters
16 October

800 meters
14 October

1500 meters
15 October

100 meters hurdles
Heats – 13 October

Final – 14 October

4 × 100 meters relay
15 October

High jump
15 October

Discus throw
12 October

References

Day 1 results
Day 2 results
Day 3 results
Day 4 results
Day 5 results

Mediterranean Games
1971